Constantine III (died between 1171 and 1173), possibly a son of Ittocorre, succeeded Comita Spanu as giudice of Gallura (northern Sardinia) in 1146 and reigned until 1161, when he retired from the world as a monk. He was the first Gallurese ruler of the Lacon dynasty and was characterised by "nobility of mind."

During a time of siege he was forced to take refuge with his relatives in Arborea. He married Elena de Lacon, daughter of Comita III of Arborea, granting her San Felice di Vada in Iurifai as a bridal gift. His second wife was Sardinia. He was succeeded by his son Barisone II.

Notes

Sources
Caravale, Mario (ed). Dizionario Biografico degli Italiani: XXVII Collenuccio – Confortini. Rome, 1982.
Manno, Giuseppe (1835). Storia di Sardegna. P.M. Visaj.

1170s deaths
Judges (judikes) of Gallura
Italian Christian monks
12th-century Italian nobility
Year of birth unknown